The second cycle of America's Next Top Model, premiered on January 13, 2004, and was hosted by model Tyra Banks. The show aimed to find the next top fashion model. The cycle's catchphrase was "They are all gorgeous, but only one has what it takes."

The prizes for this cycle were a contract with IMG Models, a fashion spread and a cover in
Jane magazine, and a cosmetics campaign with Sephora.

This was the only season to feature a cast of twelve contestants, as well the only season prior to  cycle 16 to not have a casting episode. The international destination for the cycle was Milan, Italy, marking the show’s first visit to Southern Europe and the first of three visits to Italy. 

The winner was 23-year-old Yoanna House from Jacksonville, Florida with Mercedes Scelba-Shorte placing as the runner up.

This was also the first appearance of Nigel Barker as a judge and the only season to feature Eric Nicholson as a judge.

Contestants

(Ages stated are at the time of filming)

Episodes

Summaries

Call-out order

 The contestant won the challenge and was eliminated
 The contestant won the challenge
 The contestant was eliminated
 The contestant won the competition

Average  call-out order
Final two is not included.

Bottom two

 The contestant was eliminated after her first time in the bottom two
 The contestant was eliminated after her second time in the bottom two
 The contestant was eliminated after her third time in the bottom two
 The contestant was eliminated in the final judging and placed as the runner-up

Photo shoot guide

Episode 1 photo shoot:Adam and Eve with sequins and paint
Episode 2 photo shoot:Steve Madden shoes
Episode 3 photo shoot:Laundry by Shelli Segal suspended over a giant hole
Episode 4 photo shoot:Portraying celebrity icons
Episode 5 photo shoot:Quench underwater nymphs
Episode 6 Commercial:Rollitos chips commercial
Episode 7 music video:Shake Your Body by Tyra Banks
Episode 8 photo shoot:Solstice sunglasses in the Verona Arena
Episode 10 photo shoot:Nude in pairs
Episode 11 photo shoot:High fashion beauty shots

Other cast members
 Jay Manuel – Photo Director
 J. Alexander – Runway Coach

Makeovers
 Heather - More blonde added
 Jenascia - Shoulder-length haircut to suit height
 Xiomara - Wavy wild extensions
 Catie - Twiggy inspired pixie cut
 Sara - Long blonde extensions
 Camille - Braids removed and straightened
 April - Darkened and bangs added
 Shandi - Dyed platinum blonde and given contact lenses
 Mercedes - Big animalistic extensions
 Yoanna - Modern mohawk style short cut

Post–Top Model careers 

Catie Anderson has done runway and has been signed with a few different LA agencies. She is currently signed with New York Model Management.
Anna Bradfield has done print work for Robin Callender, Anthony R. Lloyd, The Cotrice Collection and Lila couture bridalwear and has been featured on MyLittleSecretsOnline.com.
Jenascia Chakos appeared in a few Seattle calendars, modeled for Jhon Catano-Betancur and had a child. She is now a fashion director for a magazine and appeared on an episode of Wheel of Fortune in June 2010.
Xiomara Frans signed with Boss Models and has also appeared in the New York Post Latino Issue.
Bethany Harrison got married and was featured in the Totally Texas Calendar.
Yoanna House collected her prizes and signed with 1st Opinion Models. She has walked for various designers and did noted modeling work for Psychology Today, Hannah Anderson, Careline Cosmetics, Jane, Jacksonville, Metro Style, and is currently an icon for Sephora. She did commercial work for Declare Yourself, voting campaigns and cosmetics commercials with cycle 4 winner Naima Mora. She has also hosted television series such as Queen Bees and The Look for Less.
Camille McDonald signed with Major Model Management, walked in a number of fashion shows and appeared in few magazines. She also launched her own line of lingerie called Lingerwear, for which Naima Mora modeled. She participated in the America's Next Top Model All Stars cycle alongside other former contestants, finishing in eleventh place.
Sara Racey-Tabrizi signed with TBM Models, APM Models, and Mensa Management, has done print work for L'Oréal, Converse, Pulse, King, and Maxim and has landed small acting roles.
Mercedes Scelba-Shorte did some commercial and print work and is a spokesperson for the Lupus foundation. She was once signed to Nous Model Management and is currently signed to Elite Model Management and Click Models under the name "Mercedes Yvette."
Shandi Sullivan was signed with Trump Model Management. She now works as a DJ in New York City.
April Wilkner signed with Race Model Management and Wilhelmina Models in New York City. She has done some print, runway, and acting.

Notes

References

External links
 

A02
2004 American television seasons
Television shows filmed in New York City
Television shows filmed in Italy